Vernon Charles Kaiser (September 28, 1925 – January 17, 2011) was a Canadian professional ice hockey defenceman who played 50 games in the National Hockey League for the Montreal Canadiens. He was born in Preston, Ontario.

References

External links
Vern Kaiser's obituary

1925 births
2011 deaths
Canadian ice hockey defencemen
Montreal Canadiens players
Fort Worth Rangers players
Ice hockey people from Ontario
Sportspeople from Cambridge, Ontario